The Suppression of Communism Act, 1950 (Act No. 44 of 1950), renamed the Internal Security Act in 1976, was legislation of the national government in apartheid South Africa which formally banned the Communist Party of South Africa and proscribed any party or group subscribing to communism, according to a uniquely broad definition of the term. It was also used as the basis to place individuals under banning orders, and its practical effect was to isolate and silence voices of dissent.

Description
The Act, which came into effect on 17 July 1950, defined communism as any scheme aimed at achieving change—whether economic, social, political, or industrial—"by the promotion of disturbance or disorder" or any act encouraging "feelings of hostility between the European and the non-European races [...] calculated to further [disorder]". The Minister of Justice could deem any person to be a communist if he found that person's aims to be aligned with these aims, and could issue an order severely restricting the freedoms of anyone deemed to be a communist. After a nominal two-week appeal period, the person's status as a communist became an unreviewable matter of fact, and subjected the person to being barred from public participation, restricted in movement, or imprisoned.

The government justified passage of the Act by noting the involvement of members of the South African Communist Party in the internal resistance to apartheid.

Effect

The Act was worded in such a way that anyone who opposed government policy could be deemed a communist. Since the Act explicitly declared that communism sought to encourage racial disharmony, it was frequently used to legally gag critics of racial segregation and apartheid. The Act defined communism so sweepingly that defendants were frequently convicted of "statutory communism". Justice Frans Rumpff, presiding in the 1952 trial of African National Congress (ANC) leaders, observed that such an offence might have "nothing to do with communism as it is commonly known."

The Act facilitated the government suppression of organisations such as the ANC and others which advocated for equal rights for blacks, coloureds and Indians. The Act forced these groups to go underground with their activism. Because of this Act, groups such as uMkhonto we Sizwe, led by Nelson Mandela as a branch of the ANC, did seek financial support from the Communist Party.

Superseded 1982
Most of the Act was replaced in 1982 by the Internal Security Act, 1982.

References

Further reading
Benson, Mary. Nelson Mandela: The Man and the Movement, 2nd Edition. W. W. Norton & Company. 
Byrnes, Rita M. (ed.). South Africa a Country Study (Area Handbook Series). Claitor's Law Books and Publishing Division.

External links

Suppression of Communism Act, 1950 (PDF)
Statement Condemning the First Banning Orders Under the Suppression of Communism Act, 22 May 1952
South African Communist Party timeline 1870–1996

Communism in South Africa
Apartheid laws in South Africa
Anti-communism
1950 in South African law
Law enforcement in South Africa
Political and cultural purges
Counterinsurgency
Cold War in Africa
South African Communist Party
Censorship in South Africa